Aleksandr Petukhov may refer to:
 Aleksandr Petukhov (Russian footballer, born 1980), Russian footballer
 Aleksandr Petukhov (Kazakhstani footballer) (born 1985), Kazakhstani footballer